Boris Silva is an American-Peruvian singer-songwriter based in Miami, Florida. He has worked with leading music artists of the latin pop genre, such as, Prince Royce, Marco Antonio Solís and Camila. He is best known for his worldwide tours embracing tropical and kizomba rhythms. Silva performs in English, Spanish and Portuguese, and plays guitar and piano.

Early life
Silva spent part of his childhood in Lima, Peru. Silva attended a jesuit school where his musical inclinations were fostered since he was a kid. He took classes in Lima Music Conservatory as he developed his music composition, piano, guitar and vocal skills.

Silva graduated high school at age 16, and started college early. He attended and graduated from University of Arkansas where he studied music and psychology. Silva holds dual American and Peruvian citizenship.

Music career
Silva started writing music and performing at a very young age. During his teen years, he was already performing in several famous music venues of Lima including La Estación de Barranco and Florentino Bar.

Once he was back in the United States, he began his venture as a solo artist. Silva recorded an amateur demo entitled Extranjero which led him to meet well-known industry and radio personalities such as Al Zamora and Pete Manriquez, who started mentoring him. In between 2012 and 2014, Silva released the singles of his first album entitled Mentirosa which gave him the opportunity to tour the continent as well as play in concerts alongside renowned artists such as Prince Royce, Camila and Marco Antonio Solís.

From 2015 to 2018, Boris Silva worked on new records teaming up with acclaimed producers including Efrain "Junito" Dávila, Guianko Gomez, and Juan Mario "Mayito" Aracil, who are known for having worked with industry greats such as Marc Anthony, Victor Manuelle, and Carlos Vives. Singles "Bomba Kizomba" and "Eres Tú" granted Silva radio airplay throughout Latin America and millions of streams across digital platforms.

Discography
La Rebelión (2019)
Eres Tú (Versión Bachata) (2018)
Bomba Kizomba (2017)
Eres Tú (2016)
Mentirosa – Special Edition (2014)
Mentirosa (2012)

References

American bachata musicians
Living people
People from Miami
Spanish-language singers of the United States
Year of birth missing (living people)
Bachata singers